Palombo is a surname. Notable people with the surname include:

Angelo Palombo (born 1981), Italian footballer
Inés Palombo (born 1985), Argentine actress and model
Stanley Palombo, American psychiatrist

See also
Palombi, Italian surname
Mount Palombo, a mountain of Marie Byrd Land, Antarctica